The 2023 Rajya Sabha elections will be held as part of a routine six-year cycle among certain of the State Legislatures in India on July and August 2023 to elect 10 of its 245 members, of which the states through their legislators elect 233, and the remaining 12 are appointed by the President.

Elections 

 Listed According To The Dates[1]

Members Elected

Goa

Gujarat

West Bengal

By-elections

Projected Party Wise

See also 

 2023 elections in India
 List of current members of the Rajya Sabha

References 

Rajya Sabha elections in India
Rajya